Galatasaray SK. Men's 1986–1987 season is the 1986–1987 volleyball season for Turkish professional basketball club Galatasaray Yurtiçi Kargo.

The club competes in:
Turkish Men's Volleyball League
CEV Champions Cup

Team Roster Season 1986–1987

Results, schedules and standings

Results

Pts=Points, Pld=Matches played, W=Matches won, L=Matches lost, F=Points for, A=Points against

Turkish Volleyball League 1986–87

Regular season

First half

Second half

CEV Champions Cup 1986–87

First Tour

Second Tour

References

Galatasaray S.K. (men's volleyball) seasons
Galatasaray Sports Club 1986–87 season